The 1995 European Women Basketball Championship, commonly called EuroBasket Women 1995, was the 25th regional championship held by FIBA Europe. The competition was held in Czech Republic and took place from 8 June to 18 June 1995.  won the gold medal and  the silver medal while  won the bronze.

Qualification

First stage

Group A

Group B

Group C

Group D

Group E

Second stage

Group A

Group B

Group C

Additional stage

Squads

First stage

Group A

Group B

Final stages

Final standings

External links 
 FIBA Europe profile
 Todor66 profile

 
1995
1994–95 in European women's basketball
1995 in Czech women's sport
International women's basketball competitions hosted by the Czech Republic
June 1995 sports events in Europe